Hoani Retimana Waititi (12 April 1926 – 30 September 1965) was a notable New Zealand teacher, educationalist and community leader. Of Māori descent, he identified with the Te Whānau-ā-Apanui iwi. He was born in Whangaparaoa near Cape Runaway, Bay of Plenty, New Zealand, in 1926. His father was Kūaha Waititi, a farmer, and his mother was Kirimātao Heremia Kerei. He trained as a teacher in 1947–48 and gained a BA at in 1955. He worked as a teacher and in other areas of education. He died of cancer at the age of 39. Hoani Waititi Marae in West Auckland is named in his honour. June Mariu is his niece. He is the great-uncle of Rawiri Waititi.

References

1926 births
1965 deaths
New Zealand schoolteachers
New Zealand Māori schoolteachers
People from the Bay of Plenty Region
Te Whānau-ā-Apanui people
Hoani